Longemont (literally: 'Dragon's Dream', also known as Cloud Nine Shopping Mall or Shanghai Summit Shopping City) is a 60-floor,  tall skyscraper with a shopping mall at its base, and offices and Renaissance Shanghai Zhongshan Park Hotel as its main body, completed in 2006 and located in Shanghai, China.

Overview
The building is primarily a shopping mall at the lower levels. The mall is home to many multinational retailers such as Uniqlo, C&A, and Zara (retailer), and is also connected to a Renaissance Shanghai Zhongshan Park Hotel. At night the skyscraper is lit by floodlights attached to the outside walls.

Longemont is located in western Shanghai, near Zhongshan Park. The park itself is just to the north and to the north of that is Suzhou Creek.

An accident with an escalator in August 2015 resulted in the amputation of a man's leg.

Transport
The skyscraper are immediately northeast of the Zhongshan Park Station on Shanghai Metro Line 2, Line 3, and Line 4. It can be seen from Lines 3 and 4, which are elevated at this point.

See also
 List of tallest buildings in Shanghai
 Global Harbor, another shopping mall a few kilometers to the north of Zhongshan Park.

References

External links
 Cloud Nine at Emporis

2006 establishments in China
Buildings and structures completed in 2006
Shopping malls in Shanghai
Skyscrapers in Shanghai
Skyscraper office buildings in Shanghai
Skyscraper hotels in Shanghai
Changning District